Why Kings and Queens Don't Wear Crowns is a fairytale written by Princess Märtha Louise of Norway and released as a children's book in the US in 2005. The original version was released as a picture book in Norway in 2004.

The story is about her grandfather, King Olav V, when he first came from Denmark to Norway. It tells about how difficult it was to wear crowns while cross country skiing amongst other typical Norwegian winter activities. The illustrations in the book are made by the Norwegian artist Svein Nyhus.

See also
sfd

External links
The publisher's presentation of the book

Fantasy novels
2004 children's books
2005 novels
Norwegian books
21st-century Norwegian novels
Picture books
Novels set in Norway
Norwegian children's literature